Acronicta lithospila, the streaked dagger moth, is a moth of the family Noctuidae described by Augustus Radcliffe Grote in 1874. It is found in Canada (Nova Scotia, New Brunswick, Quebec, and Ontario) and the United States (including Georgia, Maryland and Oklahoma).

The wingspan is about 35 mm. Adults are on wing from June to August depending on the location.

The larvae feed on hickory and oak.

References

External links
Moths of Maryland

Acronicta
Moths of North America
Moths described in 1874